Anzhela Atabekyan (born April 11, 1938 in Yerevan) is an Armenian kanun (kanon) player, musicologist, art historian, and professor at the Yerevan State Conservatory. She was awarded the title of People's Artist of the Armenian Soviet Socialist Republic in 1986.

Biography
Anzhela Atabekyan was born in Yerevan. She is a descendant of the House of Atabekians. she graduated from the Yerevan State Musical College Named after Romanos Melikyan in 1955, and continued her studies at the Yerevan State Conservatory, graduating in 1983.

From 1956 to 1993 she was a soloist of the Folk Instruments Ensemble of the Armenian TV and Radio Company. In 1959-2000 she taught at the Romanos Melikyan Music College; since 2003 - at the Komitas State Conservatory of Yerevan.

Anzhela Atabekyan has compiled and edited 2 methodological manuals. In 1972 Atabekyan founded the "Atabekyan Sisters" vocal-instrumental ensemble. She is also the founding member of the Mealiq Unity NGO since 2012.

Awards
 People's Artist of the Armenian Soviet Socialist Republic (1986)
 Laureate of the 1st Republican (Gold Medal, 1957), All-Union (First Degree Diploma, 1957) Youth Festival, Laureate of the Union of Pop Singers (1958).

Gallery

References

 Who is who? Armenians Biographical Encyclopedia, 2 volumes, Armenian Encyclopedia. 2005.
 Armenian Encyclopedia publication, Volume 1, Abalyan-Ghushchyan, 2005.

External links

Anzhela Atabekyan
Anzhela Atabekyan Kanon

1938 births
Living people
Musicians from Yerevan
Komitas State Conservatory of Yerevan alumni
People's Artists of Armenia
Armenian musicologists